The Himriksmole, also known as Groene Ster after the recreational area and nature reserve where it is located, is a drainage mill near the village of Tytsjerk, Friesland, Netherlands.  It is a hollow post windmill of the type called spinnenkop by the Dutch. The mill is listed as a Rijksmonument, number 35675, and is used to raise the water level in the nature reserve.

History
The mill was originally built for draining the Hemrikspolder near Huizum, with parts of an 18th-century mill from Wergea being used in its construction. It was replaced by an electric pumping station and moved in 1952 to Rijperkerk and in 1977 to its current location, where it was put to a new use, supplying water to the nature reserve. The mill was destroyed by arson in 1995 but rebuilt the following year.

Description

The Himriksmole is what the Dutch describe as a spinnenkop (English: spiderhead mill). It is a small hollow post mill wound by a winch. The brake wheel on the windshaft drives the wallower at the top of the upright shaft in the body (on a spinnenkop called the head), which passes through the main post into the substructure. At the bottom of this shaft, a pair of crown wheels drive the scoop wheel axle. The  scoop wheel itself is located outside the mill. The Himriksmole is the only drainage mill with a scoop wheel in Friesland; other Frisian drainage mills use an Archimedes' screw. The head and substructure are weatherboarded.

Public access
The mill is easily reached from the public footpath running past the mill.

References

External links

Windmills in Friesland
Hollow post mills in the Netherlands
Rijksmonuments in Friesland
Windmills completed in 1996